Eliza Clark is an American actress and writer. She is the older sister of Spencer Treat Clark.

Early life
At Yale University, she was a member of the improvisational comedy group Viola Question, and the sketch comedy group The Fifth Humour.

Career
She has acted in minor parts in movies and commercials. In 1990 she briefly played Jessica Buchanan on the soap opera One Life to Live.

Clark has also directed many productions at Yale University since September 2003, including Wendy Wasserstein's Uncommon Women and Others, Rebecca Gilman's The Glory of Living and Wendy MacLeod's House of Yes. She is also a playwright; her play, The Metaphysics of Breakfast, appeared in the 2005 New York Fringe Festival. She is a member of Youngblood at the Ensemble Studio Theatre, which is a collective of professional playwrights. She wrote for and performed in the web sitcom, Inconvenient Molly.

Her plays have appeared at Provincetown Playhouse, and in the Yale Playwrights Festival at the Yale Repertory Theater, for three years in a row: "The Metaphysics of Breakfast" (2005), "Hiccup" (2006), and "Puppy."  Her most recent play, "Edgewise" performed at the Cherry Lane Theater in New York City in August 2008.  She was the recipient of the 2010 P73 playwriting fellowship from Page 73 Productions.

In 2010 she was on the writing staff of the AMC series Rubicon. In 2016-2019, she was producer of the TNT series Animal Kingdom and writer of 11 episodes. In 2021, she is the showrunner for the FX series Y: The Last Man  based on the comic book series of the same name by Brian K. Vaughan and Pia Guerra. In October 2021, the series was canceled after one season. However, Clark is committed to finding a new outlet or network for the series.

Personal life
In 2012, Clark married screenwriter and film director Zack Whedon. The two met while writing for Rubicon.

References

External links
 

20th-century American actresses
21st-century American actresses
Actresses from New York City
American film actresses
American soap opera actresses
American television actresses
American television writers
American theatre directors
Women theatre directors
American women dramatists and playwrights
Living people
American women television writers
Yale University alumni
Year of birth missing (living people)
People from Darien, Connecticut
Screenwriters from Connecticut
Screenwriters from New York (state)